Urban Development Directorate (UDD) is the administrative department in the state of Uttarakhand. It is an autonomous state government agency responsible for urban planning and development control. There are 92 Urban Local Bodies in the state of Uttarakhand i.e. 8 Municipal Corporations, 41 Municipal Councils and 43 Town Panchayats.

The objective of Urban Development Directorate is to improve the quality of life in Uttarakhand and on preservation of their heritage. There are four major schemes by Urban Development Directorate (UDD)

Schemes
 Atal Mission for Rejuvenation and Urban Transformation (AMRUT): The purpose of AMRUT is to provide basic services like Sewerage, Drainage, Water Supply, Urban Transport and build amenities in cities. Mission cities of AMRUT are Dehradun, Haridwar, Roorkee, Rudrapur, Haldwani, Kashipur and Nainital. The total population of AMRUT cities are 1509253 which consists of 49.49% of the state's urban population as per 2011 Census.
 Swachh Bharat Abhiyan-Urban: Swachh Bharat Abhiyan was initiated by Prime Minister of India Narendra Modi. It includes building toilets in each household, arrangement of dustbins for garbage, daily cleaning of roads, parks and other puplic places.
 Pradhan Mantri Awas Yojana-Urban (PMAY): The primary mission of PMAY is to provide affordable houses to everyone by 2022. Subsidized cost, affordable houses in partnership with puplic and private sectors, promotion of houses to weaker section are the main benefits of PMAY. The mission is to provide EWS (30 sq meter), LIG (60 sq meter), MIG-1 (90 sq meter), MIG-2 (110 sq meter).
 National Urban Livelihood Mission (DAY-NULM): The purpose of NULM is to reduce poverty and vulnerability of the urban poor households by providing them employment and skill based opportunities. It provides Skill Development Training and certifications to individual candidates with an ample number of business opportunities.

Administrative officers

See also
 Minority Welfare Directorate (Uttarakhand)

References

State agencies of Uttarakhand
Urban development in India